History of Arsenal Football Club spans from 1886 to the present. 
 History of Arsenal F.C. (1886–1966)
 History of Arsenal F.C. (1966–present)

See also
 

Arsenal F.C.